Quality Control: Control the Streets, Volume 2 is a compilation album released by American record label Quality Control. The album was released on August 16, 2019. The album includes contributions from Quality Control artists Migos, Lil Yachty, Lil Baby, Marlo, DJ Durel, Migo Domingo, Mango Foo, YRN Lingo, YRN Murk, Duke Deuce, Dayytona Foxx, Kollision, 24Heavy, Street Bud, Jordan Hollywood, Stefflon Don, Layton Greene, City Girls & Renni Rucci. Other guest appearances include Gucci Mane, DaBaby, Tee Grizzley, Megan Thee Stallion, Gunna, Playboi Carti, Meek Mill, Travis Scott, Mustard, Young Thug, PnB Rock, Rylo Rodriguez, French Montana, Saweetie and Tay Keith.

Music and lyrics 
On “Intro”, Gucci Mane, Lil Yachty and Migos "effortlessly trade bars" and "encapsulate everything Quality Control is about." The album reflects much of rap "moving to funkier pastures after a decade of monolithic trap beats" such as "Like That", where Mustard "chops up some New Orleans bounce" with Miami's City Girls, the U.K.’s Stefflon Don and South Carolina’s Renni Rucci.

Critical reception 

Control the Streets, Volume 2 received mixed reviews from critics. At Metacritic, the album received an average score of 58 based on 5 reviews.

Christopher Weingarten of Spin wrote that "it’s a mostly satisfying chance to hear the sound of contemporary rap evolving in real time." Cherise Johnson of HipHopDX wrote that "the 36-song project feels more like Quality Control on shuffle than a compilation — which is a good thing but misses the mark on creating an album in the purest sense."

On the other hand, Sheldon Pearce of Pitchfork wrote that QC artists' raps are "completely unimaginative" and featuring artists such as Megan Thee Stallion, Tee Grizzley and Gucci Mane outshine them. Danny Schwartz of Rolling Stone wrote that "while the QC headliners spend much of Vol. 2 spinning their wheels, the undercards provide the more compelling draw and show occasional flashes of brilliance." Fred Thomas of AllMusic wrote that "Vol. 2 of the series falls remarkably short of the high bar set by both the all star list of contributors and the victorious feel of its predecessor."

Commercial performance 
Control the Streets, Volume 2 debuted at number three on the US Billboard 200 with 63,000 album-equivalent units, becoming Quality Control's second US top 10 album.

Track listing
Adapted from HotNewHipHop, and credits adapted from Tidal.

Notes
  signifies a co-producer

Sample credits
 "Leave Em Alone" contains a sample and interpolation of "Can't Leave 'em Alone", written by Rodney Jerkins, Ciara Harris, Curtis Jackson, and LaShawn Daniels, as performed by Ciara.

Charts

Weekly charts

Year-end charts

References

2019 compilation albums
Quality Control Music albums
Albums produced by Cubeatz
Albums produced by DJ Mustard
Albums produced by Metro Boomin
Albums produced by Murda Beatz
Albums produced by Rodney Jerkins
Albums produced by Southside (record producer)
Albums produced by Tay Keith
Albums produced by Pi'erre Bourne
Motown compilation albums
Southern hip hop compilation albums